The Riverside Historic District is a U.S. historic district located in downtown Evansville, Indiana. It was added to the register in 1978 and roughly bounded by Southlane Drive, Walnut, Third, and Parrett Streets. It is also known as the Riverside Neighborhood.

Located in the heart of the historic district is the Reitz Home Museum. It was built in 1871 and is noted as one of the finest examples of French Second Empire architecture in the United States.  Other notable buildings are in the Italianate, Colonial Revival, and Renaissance Revival styles and include the Viele-Koch House (1856, c. 1872–1873), John Morford Stockwell House, Garvin House (c. 1860), St. Paul's Episcopal Church (1886), Nisbet House (1878), Sonntag-Bayard House (1863), Bosse House (1916), Duke House (1892), First Presbyterian Church (1873), Zurstadt House (c. 1853).

It was added to the National Register of Historic Places in 1978.

References

Historic districts on the National Register of Historic Places in Indiana
Houses on the National Register of Historic Places in Indiana
Second Empire architecture in Indiana
Italianate architecture in Indiana
Colonial Revival architecture in Indiana
Renaissance Revival architecture in Indiana
Houses in Evansville, Indiana
Geography of Evansville, Indiana
Historic districts in Evansville, Indiana
National Register of Historic Places in Evansville, Indiana